The Birkhead Mountains Wilderness was established by the 1984 North Carolina Wilderness Act, and it covers  in the Uwharrie National Forest at the northern end of the Uwharrie Mountains, in central North Carolina. The goals are to protect and preserve its natural resources and wilderness character and provide for public use.

History
These mountains are considered to be the oldest on the North American continent.  Evidence of early Indians dates back over 12,000 years.  The Catawba Indians inhabited the area when the Europeans began exploring the region in the late 1600s.  By 1760 settlement had begun in earnest, opened up by the explorers and traders along the Ocaneechi Trail.

The Birkhead family raised a son, John Watson (Watt), who was born in 1858.  The  that he acquired over the years were made up of many small tenant farms.  Thus the mountain range became known locally as the Birkhead Mountains.

This old plantation is the core of the wilderness.  Evidence of early Indians and settlers can often be found. Federal law protects such sites and artifacts on public land.

Recreation
All trails within the wilderness are designated hiking trails.  Travel by horse, motorized vehicle or bicycle is prohibited.  No mountain bikes or ATVs are allowed within the wilderness area.

Disperse camping is allowed in the Birkhead Mountains Wilderness.  Campers are required to stay at least  from all streams, creeks, roads and wildlife fields.  When using fire rings, campers should disperse the ring before leaving camp.  Use of cook stoves is highly recommended. Firewood is available as dead and down in the forest; campers should not cut live trees for firewood.  Also hunting is allowed in this area, orange is advisable to wear during the hunting seasons, when hiking the trails.  No permanent camps are allowed in the wilderness area.  Camping is allowed for a 14-day period within a 30-day time frame.  Dogs are allowed as long as they are on a leash and kept under control.

Parking is available at Tot Hill Trailhead, Thornburg Trailhead and Robbins Branch Trailhead.

See also
 List of U.S. Wilderness Areas
 Wilderness Act

References

External links
 Birkhead Mountains Wilderness, Wilderness.net website

IUCN Category Ib
Protected areas established in 1984
Protected areas of Randolph County, North Carolina
Wilderness areas of North Carolina
1984 establishments in North Carolina